Gamble Creek Ecological Reserve is an ecological reserve located within the asserted traditional territory of the Tsimshian First Nations, in British Columbia, Canada. It was established in 1991 under the Ecological Reserves Act to facilitate scientific research of tree species and ecosystem classification of north-coastal forest stands and bog vegetation. The reserve protects  of lowland to mid-elevation forest and bog complexes.

Geography
The reserve extends from near sea level to  elevation, and protects north coast forest and bog vegetation in both Hypermaritime Coastal Western Hemlock and Mountain Hemlock biogeoclimatic zones.

Flora
Common understory plants include Labrador tea, cranberry, lingonberry, mountain heathers, cloudberry, fern-leaved goldthread, rosy twistedstalk and sphagnum moss. Common bog plants include deergrass, beak-rush, deer-cabbage, sundew, gentiana, white marsh-marigold and sphagnum moss.

References

Provincial parks of British Columbia
1975 establishments in British Columbia
Protected areas established in 1975